Fraser Smith or Fraser-Smith may refer to
Fraser T. Smith (born 1971), English record producer, songwriter and musician
Charles Fraser-Smith (1904–1992), English author and missionary